Frisian most often refers to:

Frisia, a cross-border coastal region in Germany and the Netherlands
Frisians, the medieval and modern ethnic group inhabiting Frisia
Frisii, the ancient inhabitants of Frisia prior to 600 AD
Frisian languages, a group of West Germanic languages, including:
Old Frisian, spoken in Frisia from the 8th to 16th Century
Middle Frisian, spoken in Frisia from the 16th to 19th Century
North Frisian language, spoken in Schleswig-Holstein, Germany
Saterland Frisian language, spoken in Lower Saxony, Germany
West Frisian language, spoken in Friesland, Netherlands
Frisian cuisine, the traditional recipes and cooking methods of Frisia
Frisian or Friesian may also refer to:

Animal breeds
Friesian (chicken), a Dutch breed of chicken
East Friesian sheep, a breed of sheep notable for its high production of milk
Friesian cross, a cross of the Friesian horse with any other breed
Friesian horse, a horse breed from Friesland
Friesian Sporthorse, a type of Frisian cross, bred specifically for sport horse disciplines
Holstein Friesian cattle, a widespread black-and-white breed of dairy cattle

Other uses
Friesan Fire, a horse that ran in the 2009 Kentucky Derby
Frisian horse or cheval de frise, a type of military barrier
Frisian School, a school of philosophy based on the works of Jakob Friedrich Fries
Frisian Solar Challenge, a solar-powered boat race

See also
East Frisian (disambiguation)
West Frisian (disambiguation)

Language and nationality disambiguation pages